Bifrenaria wittigii is a species of orchid.

wittigii